A coastal path (or a littoral path) is a trail along a sea shore or a lake shore for pedestrians, and sometimes for cyclists or equestrians.

Some coastal paths were originally created for use by customs or coastguard officials looking out for smugglers landing illicit goods. In modern times some routes have been developed for tourists, with facilities such as benches, waymarks and information boards.

Examples of coastal paths
 GR 34, Brittany Coast Path, France
California Coastal Trail, US
South West Coast Path, England
Wales Coast Path
England Coast Path, a government-backed scheme for a complete coastal path around England

References